Mary Holloway (born 20 August 1917) was an athlete who competed for England.

Athletics career
Holloway represented England in the 220 yards and long jump at the 1938 British Empire Games in Sydney, New South Wales, Australia.

Personal life
Holloway was a typist by trade and lived in Bickley Street, Tooting during 1938.

References

1917 births
English female sprinters
Athletes (track and field) at the 1938 British Empire Games
Possibly living people
English female long jumpers
Commonwealth Games competitors for England